The following elections occurred in the year 1819.

North America

United States
 United States Senate election in New York, 1819/1820

See also
 :Category:1819 elections

1819
Elections